Phronesis, is a type of wisdom or intelligence relevant to practical action. It implies both good judgment and excellence of character and habits, and was a common topic of discussion in ancient Greek philosophy. Classical works about this topic are still influential today. In Aristotelian ethics, the concept was distinguished from other words for wisdom and intellectual virtues – such as episteme and sophia – because of its practical character. Among other proposals, Thomas McEvilley has proposed that the best translation is "mindfulness".

Ancient Greek philosophy

Aristotle and Plato
In some of Plato's dialogues, Socrates proposes that phronēsis is a necessary condition for all virtue. Being good, is to be an intelligent or reasonable person with intelligent and reasonable thoughts. Phronēsis allows a person to have moral or ethical strength.

In Plato's Meno,  Socrates explains how phronēsis, a quality synonymous with moral understanding, is the most important attribute to learn, although it cannot be taught and is instead gained through the development of the understanding of one's own self.

Aristotle
In the 6th book of his Nicomachean Ethics, Plato's student Aristotle distinguished between two intellectual virtues: sophia (wisdom) and phronesis, and described the relationship between them and other intellectual virtues. Sophia is a combination of nous, the ability to discern reality, and epistēmē, which is concerned with things which "could not be otherwise... e.g., the necessary truths of mathematics" and is logically built up and teachable. This involves reasoning concerning universal truths. Phronesis involves not only the ability to decide how to achieve a certain end, but also the ability to reflect upon and determine good ends consistent with the aim of living well overall.

Aristotle points out that although sophia is higher and more serious than phronesis, the highest pursuit of wisdom and happiness requires both, because phronesis facilitates sophia. He also associates phronesis with political ability.

According to Aristotle's theory of rhetoric, phronesis is one of the three types of appeal to character (ethos). The other two are respectively appeals to arete (virtue) and eunoia (goodwill).

Gaining phronesis requires experience, according to Aristotle who wrote that:...although the young may be experts in geometry and mathematics and similar branches of knowledge [sophoi], we do not consider that a young man can have Prudence [phronimos]. The reason is that Prudence [phronesis] includes a knowledge of particular facts, and this is derived from experience, which a young man does not possess; for experience is the fruit of years.

Phronesis is concerned with particulars, because it is concerned with how to act in particular situations.  One can learn the principles of action, but applying them in the real world, in situations one could not have foreseen, requires experience of the world.  For example, if one knows that one should be honest, one might act in certain situations in ways that cause pain and offense; knowing how to apply honesty in balance with other considerations and in specific contexts requires experience.

Aristotle holds that having phronesis is both necessary and sufficient for being virtuous; because phronesis is practical, it is impossible to be both phronetic and akratic; i.e., prudent persons cannot act against their "better judgement".

Modern philosophy

Heidegger
In light of his fundamental ontology, Martin Heidegger interprets Aristotle in such a way that phronesis (and practical philosophy as such) is the original form of knowledge and thus prior to sophia (and theoretical philosophy).

Heidegger interprets the Nicomachean Ethics as an ontology of Human Existence.  The practical philosophy of Aristotle is a guiding thread in his Analysis of Existence according to which "facticity" names our unique mode of being-in-the-world. Through his "existential analytic", Heidegger recognises that "Aristotelian phenomenology" suggests three fundamental movements of life including póiesis, práxis, theoría, and that these have three corresponding dispositions: téchne, phrónesis and sophía. Heidegger considers these as modalities of Being inherent in the structure of Dasein as being-in-the-world that is situated within the context of concern and care. According to Heidegger phronesis in Aristotle's work discloses the right and proper way to Dasein. Heidegger sees phronesis as a mode of comportment in and toward the world, a way of orienting oneself and thus of caring-seeing-knowing and enabling a particular way of being concerned.

While techne is a way of being concerned with things and principles of production and theoria a way of being concerned with eternal principles, phronesis is a way of being concerned with one's life (qua action) and with the lives of others and all particular circumstances as purview of praxis. Phronesis is a disposition or habit, which reveals the being of the action while deliberation is the mode of bringing about the disclosive appropriation of that action. In other words, deliberation is the way in which the phronetic nature of Dasein’s insight is made manifest.

Phronesis is a form of circumspection, connected to conscience and resoluteness respectively being-resolved in action of human existence (Dasein) as práxis. As such it discloses the concrete possibilities of being in a situation, as the starting point of meaningful action, processed with resolution, while facing the contingencies of life.
However Heidegger's ontologisation has been criticised as closing práxis within a horizon of solipsistic decision that deforms its political sense that is its practico-political configuration (Volpi, 2007).

Other Uses in Psychology
Phronesis according to Kristjansson, Fowers, Darnell and Pollard phronesis is about making decisions in regards to moral events or circumstances. There is recent work to bring back the virtue of practical judgement to overcome disagreements and conflicts in the form of Aristotle’s phronesis. In Aristotle’s work, phronesis is the intellectual virtue that helps turn one’s moral instincts into practical action by inculcating the practical know-how to translate virtue in thought into concrete successful action and this will produce phronimos by being able to weigh up the most integral parts of various virtues and competing goals in moral situations. Moral virtues helps any person to achieve the end, phronesis, is what it takes to figure out the right means to gain that end. Without moral virtues, phronesis degenerates into a inability to make those practical actions in regards to committing to those ends that are genuine goods for man and without phronesis we may be lost in regards to exercising decisive judgment on any moral matter. The concept of phronesis includes the telos that is the "well-being for all in society." The common wisdom model was developed by Grossmann, Weststrate, Ardelt et al as explaining the foundation for making moral functioning to occur and by strategy for fitting it to the context of the situation at hand, using major scholars research on the idea that wisdom is best described as morally-grounded excellence in social-cognitive processing, by empirical wisdom scientists. Moral grounding is what the researchers found that the following is the moral basis: "balance of self-interests and other interests, pursuit of truth (as opposed to dishonesty), and orientation toward shared humanity". And secondly it means excellence in social cognitive processing: "context adaptability (e.g. practical or pragmatic reasoning, optimization of behavior towards achieving certain outcomes),
perspectivism (e.g. considering diverse perspectives, foresight and long-term thinking), dialectical and reflective thinking (e.g. balancing and integrating points of view, entertaining opposites) and epistemic modesty (e.g. unbiased/accurate thinking, looking through illusions, understanding your own limitations)."

In the social sciences
In After Virtue, Alasdair MacIntyre called for a phronetic social science. He points out that for every prediction made by a social scientific theory there are usually counter-examples. Hence the unpredictability of human beings and human life requires a focus on practical experiences.

In his book Cognitive Capitalism, The psychologist Heiner Rindermann uses the term phronesis for describing a rational approach of thinking and action: "a circumspect and thoughtful way of life in a rational manner" (p. 188). Intelligence supports such a "burgher" lifestyle.

See also
 Casuistry
 Common sense
 Dianoia
 Doctrine of the Mean
 Élan vital
 Rhetorical reason

References

Sources and further reading
 Aristotle, Nicomachean Ethics trans. Terence Irwin (2nd edition; Hackett, 1999) 
 Robert Bernasconi, “Heidegger’s Destruction of Phronesis,” Southern Journal of Philosophy 28 supp. (1989): 127–147.
 Clifford Geertz, Empowering_Aristotle "Empowering Aristotle". Science, vol. 293, July 6, 2001, p. 53.
 Martin Heidegger, Plato's Sophist (Bloomington: Indiana University Press, 1997).
 Gerard J. Hughes, Aristotle on Ethics (Routledge, 2001) 
 Alasdair MacIntyre, After Virtue (Duckworth, 1985) 
 William McNeill, The Glance of the Eye: Heidegger, Aristotle, and the Ends of Theory (Albany: State University of New York Press, 1999).
 Ikujiro Nonaka, Managing Flow: A Process Theory of the Knowledge-Based Firm (Palgrave Macmillan, New York, 2008).
 Amélie Oksenberg Rorty [ed.], Essays on Aristotle's Ethics (University of California Press, 1980) 
 Richard Sorabji, "Aristotle on the Role of Intellect in Virtue" (Proceedings of the Aristotelian Society 74, 1973–1974; pp. 107–129.  Reprinted in Rorty)
 David Wiggins, "Deliberation and Practical Reason" (Proceedings of the Aristotelian Society 76, 1975–1976; pp. 29–51.  Reprinted in Rorty)
 Roberto Andorno, "Do our moral judgements need to be guided by principles?" Cambridge Quarterly of Healthcare Ethics 2012, 21(4):457–465.

External links
 

Aristotelianism
Concepts in ancient Greek ethics
Intelligence
Philosophy of Aristotle
Virtue